Providence Cove is a cove bounded by ice cliffs which lies at the foot of Remus Glacier in the southeast corner of Neny Fjord, along the west coast of Graham Land. First roughly surveyed in 1936 by the British Graham Land Expedition (BGLE) under Rymill. It was resurveyed in 1940-41 by members of the United States Antarctic Service (USAS), and so named by them because on first arrival it seemed providential that a site for the East Base was found so quickly and easily. It was soon determined, however, that the cove did not provide a suitable site for the base.

Coves of Graham Land
Fallières Coast